South Carolina Highway 517 (SC 517, also known as Isle of Palms (IOP) Connector or Clyde Moultrie Dangerfield Highway) is a  state highway in the eastern part of the Charleston, South Carolina metropolitan area. It exists completely within Charleston County, in the southeastern part of the U.S. state of South Carolina. The highway travels in a southeast–northwest orientation from Isle of Palms to Mount Pleasant. Most of the highway consists of the Isle of Palms Connector Bridge.

Route description
SC 517 begins at an intersection with SC 703 (Palm Boulevard) in Isle of Palms. It passes over the Intracoastal Waterway. The only significant intersection on the route, aside from each terminus, is with Rifle Range Road. The road continues northwest until it meets its northern terminus at U.S. Route 17 (US 17) in Mount Pleasant.

The entire length of SC 517 is part of the National Highway System, a system of roadways important to the nation's economy, defense, and mobility.

History

Established in 1993 as new construction, it included a median lane, which is used during evacuation emergencies.  Historically, SC 517 existed once before from 1942-1948; connecting between SC 3, north of Blackville, to SC 5, north of Denmark.  Today it is Gardenia Road (S-6-38) and Springfield Road (S-5-29).

Major intersections

See also

References

External links

 
 SC 517 at Virginia Highways' South Carolina Highways Annex

517
Transportation in Charleston County, South Carolina
Mount Pleasant, South Carolina